Peggy Sullivan (August 12, 1929 – April 13, 2020) was an American librarian and educator.  She was elected president of the American Library Association and was a scholar of the history of librarianship.

Biography

Throughout her career, Sullivan served as:
Dean, Graduate School of Library and Information Science, Dominican University (formerly Rosary College), River Forest, Illinois (1995-1997)
Executive Director, American Library Association, Chicago, Illinois (1992-1994)
Director and Professor, University Libraries, Northern Illinois University, De Kalb, Illinois (1990-1992)
Dean and Professor, College of Professional Studies, Northern Illinois University,  De Kalb, Illinois (1981-1992)
Assistant Commissioner, Chicago Public Library, Chicago, Illinois (1977–1981).
Dean of Students, University of Chicago Graduate Library School, 1974-1977.

From 1952 to 1977, Sullivan held positions of increasing responsibility in public and school libraries. She directed the national Knapp School Libraries Project for the American Association of School Librarians (1963–1968) which had received $1,130,000 to raise the standards of school libraries. She served on the faculties of the University of Pittsburgh and the University of Chicago Graduate Library School.  She also taught on part-time, summer or interim bases at six other library education programs (the University of Maryland, Rutgers University-New Brunswick, Syracuse University, the Catholic University of America, Drexel University, and Rosary College) and directed the American Library Association’s Office for Library Personnel Resources.

Highlights of Sullivan’s career include being President of ALA’s Children’s Services Division (now the Association for Library Services to Children – ALSC) (1976–1977), Chair Centennial Celebration of the American Library Association (1976), assistant commissioner for extension services at the Chicago Public Library (1977–1981), ALA president (1980–1981), ALA executive director (1992–1994), Dean of the LIS Program at Rosary College (now Dominican University), Dean of the College of Professional Studies at Northern Illinois University, and numerous university teaching positions. Sullivan served as director of the Knapp School Libraries Project (1963–1968). This project had great national impact on convincing the public of the need for high quality school library media programs.

Sullivan was the 1991 recipient of ALA’s Joseph W. Lippincott Award, and was an alumnus of the University of Chicago, Catholic University and Clarke College.

In 2004, Sullivan established the Sullivan Award for Public Library Administrators. This award is presented annually to an individual who has shown exceptional understanding and support of public library service to children while having general management/supervisory/administrative responsibility that has included public library service to children in its scope. She also presented the Sullivan Award to a faculty member in the NIU College of Health and Human Sciences (formerly the College of Professional Studies, where she was dean) for achievement in research. It is presented every fall on the NIU campus.

Education 

Ph.D., University of Chicago Graduate Library School. 1972
M.S. in L.S., Catholic University of America, Washington, DC, 1953; Thesis:(1953). Work of public libraries with trade unions in the United States.
B.A., Clarke College, Dubuque, IA, 1950

Publications 

Carl H. Milam and the American Library Association (H. W. Wilson, 1976) 
Public Libraries: Smart Practices in Personnel, with William H. Ptacek (Libraries Unlimited, 1978)  
Opportunities in Library and Information Science (Vocational Guidance Manuals, 1977)  (Sullivan had varying responsibilities for later editions of this title with various publishers)
Problems in School Media Management (Bowker, 1972)  
Many Names for Eileen (Follett, 1969) 
The O’Donnells (Follett, 1956)
More than 100 articles on various aspects of librarianship, education, administration, and history
Reviews of books and other media, also numbering in excess of 100, for a variety of educational and library publications, as well as for The Baltimore Sun, The Washington Post, and The Chicago Tribune

Recognitions and special assignments 

UNESCO Consultant on School Libraries, Australia, 1970
President, American Library Association, 1980–1981. Theme: "Libraries and the Pursuit of Happiness."
Numerous committee appointments and elective offices in the American Library Association, 1959 and continuing, including the presidency of the Children’s Services Division, 1976–1977, and membership on the ALA Council
Distinguished Service Award, Association for Library Service to Children, 2000
Lippincott Award, American Library Association, 1991
Distinguished Alumnus Award, School of Library and Information Science, Catholic University of America
Distinguished Alumnus Award, Clarke College,
Honors Award, High School Section, Catholic Library Association
Inclusion in Marquis Who’s Who in America and its various regional and special publications
Consultancies relating to seminary libraries, fundraising, personnel management, faculty development, library education curriculum, library facilities planning, and general educational and library issues provided to a range of institutions and agencies, including the National Endowment for the Humanities, the New York Public Library, the Ford Foundation, the Lilly Foundation, and the US Department of Education
Vice President and Program Chair, Caxton Club of Chicago, 2001–2002
Treasurer, Chicago Literary Club, 2006–2007
Consulting assignments and the presentation of speeches, workshops, storytelling programs, as well as participation in ALA accreditation of library education programs have taken Peggy Sullivan to every one of the fifty US states and every continent except Antarctica (which she visited on her own).
Committee appointments in the Illinois Library Association, the Catholic Library Association, the Association of College and Research Libraries, the Library Administration Division of the American Library Association, and the American Association of School Librarians
Donor, the Sullivan Award for Public Library Administrators, American Library Association, 2004 and continuing annually

Awards and recognition 
In 2008, Sullivan was named an honorary member of the American Library Association. She was nominated in recognition of over 50 years of dedicated librarianship during which she wrote the definitive scholarly history of the tenure of Carl Milam (ALA secretary 1920-1946) and the growth of the American Library Association to an international organization."

Sullivan was the only honorary member to have a giant image of her book on a parking garage in the Kansas City Library District. The facade includes her 1956 children’s book, The O’Donnells, as a title on the Community Bookshelf.

References

 

Presidents of the American Library Association
American librarians
American women librarians
University of Pittsburgh faculty
University of Chicago faculty
Catholic University of America alumni
Clarke University alumni
University of Chicago Graduate Library School alumni
Library science scholars
Catholic University of America School of Library and Information Science faculty
1929 births
2020 deaths
American women academics
21st-century American women